The following is a timeline of the history of the city of Vienna, Austria.

Prior to 19th century

 1st-millennium BCE – Vindobona settled.
 180 – Roman emperor Marcus Aurelius dies in Vindobona.
 740 - Church of St Ruprecht, the oldest church in Vienna, first built.
 881 – The Bavarians had their first clash at Wenia with the Hungarians (first mention of Vienna).
 1030 – The Hungarians besiege Vienna.
 1155
 Henry II, Duke of Austria appoints Vienna as capital city.
 Schottenstift founded.
 1160 – St. Stephen's Cathedral built.
 1221 – Vienna receives rights as staple port.
 1237 - Vienna received a charter of freedom from Frederick II., confirmed in 1247.
 1251 – Ottokar II of Bohemia in power.
 1276 – Foundation stone for the Minorites Church laid by King Ottokar II of Bohemia.
 1278 – City charter granted.
 1280 – Jans der Enikel writes the Fürstenbuch, a first history of the city.
 1349 – Augustinian Church consecrated.
 1365 – University of Vienna founded.university.
 1421 – Jews expelled.
 1482 – Johann Winterburger sets up printing press (approximate date).
 1485
 Siege of Vienna by Kingdom of Hungary, city passed to Hungary.
 Royal Court of King Matthias Corvinus of Hungary relocated to Vienna (known as Bécs in Hungarian).
 1515 – First Congress of Vienna.
 1529 – Siege of Vienna by Turks.
 1556 – Vienna becomes seat of Holy Roman Empire under Ferdinand I.
 1598 – Donaukanal regulated.
 1600 – Melchior Khlesl becomes Bishop of Vienna.
 1643 – Schönbrunn Palace built.
 1668 – July: Premiere of Cesti's opera Il pomo d'oro.
 1678 – Palais Modena completed.
 1679 – Great Plague of Vienna.

 1683 – Battle of Vienna.
 1684 – Kollschitzky coffeehouse in business.
 1692 – Academy of Fine Arts Vienna founded.
 1702 – Palais Strozzi completed.
 1703 – Palais Liechtenstein built.
 1704 – Linienwall fortification built.
 1709 – Theater am Kärntnertor built.
 1712 – Palais Trautson completed.
 1713 – Plague epidemic.
 1716 – Palais Kinsky completed.
 1718 – Vienna Porcelain Manufactory founded.
 1724 – Population: 150,000.
 1735 – Winter Riding School built.
 1741 – Burgtheater opens.

 1762 – Premiere of Gluck's opera Orfeo ed Euridice.
 1765
 Tiergarten Schönbrunn (zoo) opens.
 Artaria publishing firm founded.
 1766 – Prater opens.
 1770 – Chess-playing Mechanical Turk introduced at Schönbrunn Palace.
 1772 – Freyung Christmas market begins.
 1781- Mozart arrives to Vienna from Salzburg.
 1786 - Premiere of  Mozart’s Marriage of Figaro. 
 Demel confectionery and Gesellschaft der Associierten founded.
 1 May: Premiere of Mozart's opera The Marriage of Figaro.
 1790 – Population: 260,000.
 1791 – 30 September: Premiere of Mozart's The Magic Flute. Wolfgang Amadeus Mozart dies.
 1792 – Schweighofer piano manufactury established. Beethoven arrives to Vienna from Bonn. 
 1800 – 2 April: Premiere of Beethoven's Symphony No. 1.

19th century
 1802 – Palais Erdődy commissioned.
 1805
 23 May: Premiere of Beethoven's opera Fidelio.
 13 November: Napoleon takes city.
 1807 – Czartoryski Palace built.
 1808 – 22 December: Premiere of Beethoven's Fifth and Sixth Symphonies, Choral Fantasy, and Piano Concerto No. 4 at the Theater an der Wien.
 1809 – Battle of Aspern-Essling. Joseph Haydn dies.
 1814
 Congress of Vienna.
 C.F. Peters music publisher in business.
 1824 – 7 May: Premiere of Beethoven's Symphony No. 9.
 1827- 27 March: Ludwig van Beethoven dies.
 1829 – Leopoldine Society formed.
 1832 – Sachertorte invented.
 1840 - Population: 469,400.
 1842 
 Austrian Southern Railway begins.
 Philharmonische Academie formed.
 1847 – Austrian Academy of Sciences established.

 1848 – Vienna Uprising.
 1850
 City expanded beyond Innere Stadt.
 Population: 551,300.
 1858 – Ringstraße constructed.
 1860/1864 - the fine and lofty tower of the Cathedral of St Stephen rebuilt.
 1864
 Palais Todesco completed.
 Neue Freie Presse newspaper begins publication.
 1867 – Palais Toskana built.
 1869 
 Vienna State Opera house built.
 Population: 842,951.
 1870 
 Works started to regulate the Danube to make it safe for navigation.
 Musikverein inaugurated.
 1873
 World exposition held.
 Café Landtmann and Hotel Imperial in business.
 1874
 Palais Chotek completed.
 Premiere of Strauss's opera Die Fledermaus.
 1875 – Danube levees constructed.
 1876 
 Academy of Fine Arts building erected.
 Hotel Sacher established.
 Café Central in business.
 1878 – Palais Nathaniel Rothschild built.
 1879 – Geological Office formed.
 1880 
 Café Sperl in business.
 Population: 1,090,119.
 1881 – Palace of Justice (Vienna) built.
 1882 – Palmenhaus Schönbrunn (greenhouse) opens.
 1883 - Completion of the Vienna City Hall, an immense Gothic building.
 1884 – Palais Albert Rothschild built.
 1885 – Goldscheider Manufactory and Majolica Factory and Alpinen Gesellschaft Edelraute (hiking club) established.
 1886 – Hermesvilla built.
 1887 – Historical Museum of the City of Vienna established.
 1889 –  active.

 1890 – City expanded; population: 1,364,548.
 1891 – Kunsthistorisches Museum (art museum) opens.
 1892 – City hosts the 1892 European Figure Skating Championships.
 1894
 January: City hosts the 1894 European Figure Skating Championships.
 Palais Rothschild (Prinz-Eugen-Straße) built.
 1895 – Palais Lanckoroński completed.
 1897
 Wiener Riesenrad erected.
 Vienna Secession art group founded.
 1898
 Wiener Stadtbahn begins.
 Secession Building constructed.
 City hosts the 1898 ICA Track Cycling World Championships.
 1899
 Freud's The Interpretation of Dreams published.
  magazine begins publication.
 1900 – Population: 1,769,137.

20th century

1900s–1940s
 1901 – Universal Edition in business.
 1902 
 Freudenau harbor constructed.
 Franciszek Trześniewski opens restaurant.
 1903
 Kuchelau harbor constructed.
 Wiener Werkstätte art group founded.
 1904
 Floridsdorf district added.
  in business.
 1907 – City hosts the 1907 World Figure Skating Championships.
 1908 – Vienna Psychoanalytic Society active.
 1910 – Population: 2,031,000.
 1912 – Aspern Airfield opens.
 1913 
 23 February: Premiere of Schoenberg's Gurre-Lieder.
  becomes mayor.
 1915 – April: Conference of Central European Socialist Parties held in Vienna.

 1916 – 30 November: Funeral of Franz Joseph I of Austria.
 1918 – Red Vienna begins.
 1919 
 Lainzer Tiergarten opens.
 Jakob Reumann becomes mayor.
 1920
 Austrian National Library established.
 Hungarian Historical Institute in Vienna founded.
 1921
 The Geistkreis seminar begins.
  (garden) established.
 International Working Union of Socialist Parties founded in Vienna.
 1923 
 Karl Seitz becomes mayor.
 Phaidon Press founded.
 1924 – Collegium Hungaricum Vienna founded.
 1925 –  (cinema) opens.
 1929 – Austrian Bridge Federation founded.
 1931 – Ernst-Happel-Stadion built.
 1934 – Richard Schmitz becomes mayor.

 1938 
 Anschluss.
 Hermann Neubacher becomes mayor.
 City expands.
 1940 – Philipp Wilhelm Jung becomes mayor.
 1941 – Kehal Adas Yereim Vien established.
 1942 – Bombing begins.
 1943
 30 August: Vienna-Schwechat (Heidfeld) subcamp of the Mauthausen concentration camp established. Its prisoners were mostly Polish, Soviet, Italian and Spanish.
 30 December: Hanns Blaschke becomes mayor.
 1944
 Vienna-Schwechat ('Santa') subcamp of Mauthausen established.
 13 July: Vienna-Schwechat (Heidfeld) subcamp dissolved, Vienna-Floridsdorf subcamp of Mauthausen established. Prisoners moved from Schwechat (Heidfeld) to Floridsdorf.
 20 August: Vienna-Saurerwerke subcamp of Mauthausen established. Its prisoners were mostly Poles and Soviet citizens.
 September: Vienna-Hinterbrühl subcamp of Mauthausen established. Its prisoners were mostly Polish, Soviet and Italian.
 28 September: Vienna-Schönbrunn subcamp of Mauthausen established.
 1945 
 Vienna Offensive.
 31 March: Vienna-Schwechat ('Santa') subcamp dissolved. Prisoners moved to the Hinterbrühl subcamp.
 1 April: Floridsdorf, Hinterbrühl and Schönbrunn subcamps dissolved. Prisoners are evacuated by the SS in death marches to the Steyr-Münichholz subcamp and main Mauthausen camp. Massacre of 52 Hinterbrühl prisoners, who were unable to walk.
 2 April: Vienna-Saurerwerke subcamp dissolved. Prisoners are evacuated by the SS in a death march to the Steyr-Münichholz subcamp, except for ill prisoners who are left behind.
 Allied-occupied city.
 Rudolf Prikryl becomes mayor, succeeded by Theodor Körner.
 Soviet War Memorial installed.
 1948 – Italian Cultural Institute in Vienna founded.

1950s–1990s
 1951
 March: City hosts the 1951 World Table Tennis Championships.
 Franz Jonas becomes mayor.
 1952 – City hosts the 1952 European Figure Skating Championships.
 1954 
 Vienna International Airport opens.
 Flood.
 1955 – City hosts the 1955 World Figure Skating Championships.
 1957
 February: City hosts the 1957 European Figure Skating Championships.
 International Atomic Energy Agency headquartered in Vienna.
 1958 –  built.

 1959
 Vienna Museum opens.
 City hosts World Festival of Youth and Students.
 1960 – Österreichische Mediathek (sound archive) headquartered in city.
 1961 – Vienna summit of USA and USSR.
 1962 – Vienna S-Bahn begins.
 1964 – Österreichisches Filmmuseum established.
 1965 –  becomes mayor.
 1967
 February–March: City hosts the 1967 World Figure Skating Championships.
 March: City hosts the 1967 Ice Hockey World Championships.
 1968 – Austrian Science Fund formed.
 1969 – OPEC Headquarter moves from Geneva, Switzerland to Vienna.
 1970 –  becomes mayor.
 1971 – City hosts the 1971 World Fencing Championships.
 1973 – Leopold Gratz becomes mayor.
 1974 – Polish Institute in Vienna founded.

 1976
 8 May: Vienna U-Bahn opens.
 1 August: Reichsbrücke collapse.
 1977 – City hosts the 1977 Ice Hockey World Championships.
 1979
 March: City hosts the 1979 World Figure Skating Championships.
 Vienna Islamic Centre and UNO City built.
 1983
 July: City hosts the 1983 World Fencing Championships.
 Donauinselfest begins.
 1984 – Helmut Zilk becomes mayor.
 1985 
 Airport attack.
 Institute of Technology Assessment founded.
 1988 
 New Danube channel constructed.
 ImPulsTanz Vienna International Dance Festival begins
 1990 – Museum in Progress created.
 1991 – City hosts the 1991 World Rowing Championships.
 1992 – The biggest AIDS charity event in Europe, the Life Ball begins.
 1993 – World Conference on Human Rights held.
 1994
 Czech Centre in Vienna founded.
 Michael Häupl becomes mayor.
 1995 – Secretariat for the Organization for Security and Co-operation in Europe established.
 1996 – City hosts the 1996 Men's Ice Hockey World Championships.
 1998 –  built.
 1999 – Millennium Tower built.
 2000
 City website online (approximate date).
  built.

21st century

 2001 –  and Ares Tower built. 
 2003 – Lighthouse Wien founded.
 2004 –  built.
 2005 – City co-hosts the 2005 IIHF World Championship.
 2007 – EU Fundamental Rights Agency established.
 2008
 World Institute for Nuclear Security headquartered in city.
 UEFA European Football Championship held.
 2010 – Wiener Staatsballet formed.
 2011
 Smart City Wien begins.
 Funeral of Otto von Habsburg.
 2014 – Population: 1,797,337.
 2020 – The Vienna attack occurs.

See also
 History of Vienna
 History of the Jews in Vienna
 List of mayors of Vienna
 Years in Austria
 Timelines of other cities in Austria: Graz, Linz, Salzburg

References

This article incorporates information from the German Wikipedia.

Bibliography

in English
published in the 18th-19th century
 
 
 
 
 
  + v.2
 
 
 
 
 
 
 
 
 

published in the 20th century
 
 
 
 
 
 

published in the 21st century

in German

External links

 Links to fulltext city directories for Vienna via Wikisource
 Items related to Vienna, various dates (via Europeana)

 
Vienna-related lists
Vienna
vienna
Vienna